Alexander Fisher was a sound engineer. For 36 years he participated in creating movies and TV programs. He was born on 25 December 1903 in pre-Revolutionary Russia. He died in September 1993 (age 89) in Hertfordshire, England.

Career

After some movie work together, Alexander Fisher became Peter Sellers' favorite sound technician. In his own productions Peter Sellers eventually refused to work with anyone else in sound. On a photograph from Peter Sellers to Alexander
the dedication says: "Why, why, why, can't we have some silence please". Which was Sash's catch phrase and how he was greeted on the set. And further on: "To Sash, with grateful thanks for another wonderful job – Peter Sellers".

During his career Alexander Fisher worked with many movie stars, who gave him presents of dedication, among others Gina Lollobrigida, Elizabeth Taylor.

Alexander Fisher was an early member of the trade union The Association of Cine-Technicians, one of the early front runners of the Broadcasting, Entertainment, Cinematograph and Theatre Union.

His membership card from 1937 shows him as the 100th member, employed at Pinewood Studios.

Film and television work 

1971 UFO (TV series) (sound – 1 episode)

1970 A Man Called Sledge (sound mixer)

1969 The Avengers (TV series) (sound – 1 episode)

1968 Romeo and Juliet (sound mixer)

1967 Five Million Years to Earth (sound)

1967 The Bobo (sound)

1967 Casino Royale (sound)

1967 Prehistoric Women (sound mixer)

1966 After the Fox (sound)

1965 The Alphabet Murders (sound)

1965 The Truth About Spring (sound)

1963 The Pink Panther (sound)

1962 Walt Disney's Wonderful World of Color (TV series) (sound – 1 episode)

1961 The Happy Thieves (sound)

1961 Come September (sound)

1961 Romanoff and Juliet (sound)

1960 It Started in Naples (sound)

1959 Ben-Hur (sound)

1957 Action of the Tiger (sound)

1957 Dangerous Youth (sound)

1956 Port Afrique (sound)

1956 Bhowani Junction (sound)

1955 Room in the House (sound)

1954 Svengali (sound)

1953 Knights of the Round Table (sound mixer – uncredited)

1953 Mogambo (sound – as A.S. Fisher)

1950 The Miniver Story (sound)

1949 Conspirator (sound)

1949 Edward, My Son (sound)

 1948 The Outsider (sound)
 1948 Spring in Park Lane (sound)
 1947 While I Live (sound – as Alexander Fisher)
 1947 Odd Man Out (sound – as A.Fisher)
 1940 Spy for a Day (sound)
 1940 French Without Tears (sound)
 1938 The Gang (sound)
 1938 Climbing High (sound – as Alex Fisher)
 1938 Pygmalion (sound – as Alex Fisher)
 1938 Sweet Devil (sound – as Alex Fisher)
 1937 Larceny Street (sound – as Alex Fisher)
 1936 Rembrandt (sound – as A. Fisher)
 1936 Love in Exile (sound)
 1935 While Parents Sleep (sound)
 1935 The Village Squire (sound)

Other Activities 
Alexander Fisher was fluent in Russian.  
He assisted the British Council as an interpreter for Russian dignitaries visiting the UK and London in particular.
One of those occasions was Yuri Gagarin's four-day visit to London in July 1961. Here is a photograph with Alexander Fisher on the left and Yuri Gagarin on the right. A second photograph shows the two at a social event.

Rumor has it, that Alexander Fisher was affiliated with the British MI6.
His movie work required travel to foreign countries, all together he spent almost 20 years in Italy. His knowledge of foreign languages was an additional qualification.

Awards 
In 1945 he was decorated with the Order of the White Eagle by the Yugoslavian Government.

References

External links 
 Alexander Fisher at the Internet Movie Database
 Alexander Fisher at British Film Institute
 Alexander Fisher at GlynskyandPete.com
 photograph of Sash at Work

1903 births
1993 deaths
Russian audio engineers
Emigrants from the Russian Empire to the United Kingdom